This is the solo discography of Q-Tip, an American hip hop musician, record producer, and DJ.

Albums

Studio albums

Mixtapes

Singles

As lead artist

As featured artist

Promotional singles

Guest appearances

Music videos

See also 
Q-Tip production discography
A Tribe Called Quest discography
The Ummah discography

References

Hip hop discographies
Discographies of American artists